The Spinaway Stakes is an American Thoroughbred horse race run annually at Saratoga Race Course in Saratoga Springs, New York.  Open to two-year-old fillies, it is a Grade I event contested at a distance of seven furlongs (1,408 metres) on dirt. The Spinaway is part of the Breeders' Cup Challenge series, providing a "Win and You're In" berth for the Breeders' Cup Juvenile Fillies.

The race was named for Spinaway who in 1880 was the dominant two-year-old filly in the United States and who beat her male counterparts in every one of her seven stakes wins.

Since inception in  1881, the Spinaway has been run at different distances:
 5 furlongs : 1881–1900
 5.5 furlongs : 1901–1921
 6 furlongs : 1922–1993
 7 furlongs : 1994 to present

The Spinaway was hosted by Belmont Park in 1943, 1944 and 1945. It was not run from 1892 to 1900. The race was cancelled in 1911 and 1912 following a New York State legislated ban on parimutuel betting.

In 2016, Sweet Loretta and Pretty City Dancer finished in a dead heat for first place. Both fillies were sired by leading sire Tapit.

Records
Speed record:
 1:22.28 – Hot Dixie Chick (2009) (current distance – 7 furlongs)
 1:08:60 – Ruffian  (1974) (previous distance – 6 furlongs)

Most wins by a jockey:
 5 – Ángel Cordero Jr. (1977, 1980, 1984, 1987, 1989)

Most consecutive wins by a jockey:
 3 – Tommy May (1945, 1946, 1947)

Most wins by a trainer:
 6 – D. Wayne Lukas (1984, 1985, 1987, 1989, 1994, 1995)
 6 - Todd A. Pletcher (1999, 2003, 2005, 2010, 2015, 2016)
Most wins by an owner:
 4 – James R. Keene (1902, 1906, 1908, 1915)
 4 – Greentree Stable (1929, 1932, 1949, 1955)

Winners since 1948

 † In 1959, Natalma finished first, but was disqualified and set back to third.
 † In 1992, Sky Beauty finished first but was disqualified and set back to third.
 ‡ In 2016, Pretty City Dancer and Sweet Loretta dead heated for first place.

Earlier winners

1947 – Bellesoeur
1946 – Pipette
1945 – Sopranist
1944 – Price Level
1943 – Bee Mac
1942 – Our Page
1941 – Mar-Kell
1940 – Nasca
1939 – Now What
1938 – Dinner Date
1937 – Merry Lassie
1936 – Maecloud
1935 – Forever Yours
1934 – Vicaress
1933 – Contessa
1932 – Easy Day
1931 – Top Flight
1930 – Risque
1929 – Goose Egg
1928 – Atlantis
1927 – Twitter
1926 – Bonnie Pennant
1925 – Cinema
1924 – Blue Warbler
1923 – Anna Marrone II
1922 – Edict
1921 – Miss Joy
1920 – Prudery
1919 – Constancy
1918 – Passing Shower
1917 – Olive Wood
1916 – Yankee Witch
1915 – Jacoby
1914 – Lady Barbary
1913 – Casuarina
1910 – Bashti
1909 – Ocean Bound
1908 – Maskette
1907 – Julia Powell
1906 – Court Dress
1905 – Edna Jackson
1904 – Tanya
1903 – Raglan
1902 – Duster
1901 – Rossignol
1891 – Promenade
1890 – Sallie McClelland
1889 – Daisy F.
1888 – Gypsy Queen
1887 – Los Angeles
1886 – Grisette
1885 – Biggonet
1884 – Mission Belle
1883 – Tolu
1882 – Miss Woodford
1881 – Memento

References

 The 2008 Spinaway Stakes at the NTRA

1881 establishments in New York (state)
Horse races in New York (state)
Saratoga Race Course
Flat horse races for two-year-old fillies
Grade 1 stakes races in the United States
Graded stakes races in the United States
Recurring events established in 1881